The Imperial German Army (1871–1919), officially referred to as the German Army, was the unified ground and air force of the German Empire. It was established in 1871 with the political unification of Germany under the leadership of Prussia, and was dissolved in 1919, after the defeat of the German Empire in World War I (1914–1918).

Formation and name

The states that made up the German Empire contributed their armies; within the German Confederation, formed after the Napoleonic Wars, each state was responsible for maintaining certain units to be put at the disposal of the Confederation in case of conflict. When operating together, the units were known as the Federal Army. The Federal Army system functioned during various conflicts of the 19th century, such as the First Schleswig War from 1848 to 1852. However, by the time of the Second Schleswig War of 1864, tension had grown between the main powers of the confederation, the Austrian Empire and the Kingdom of Prussia, and the German Confederation was dissolved after the Austro-Prussian War of 1866.

Prussia formed the North German Confederation and the treaty provided for the maintenance of a Federal Army and a Federal Navy ( or ). Further laws on military duty also used these terms. Conventions (some later amended) were entered into between the North German Confederation and its member states, subordinating their armies to the Prussian army in time of war, and giving the Prussian Army control over training, doctrine and equipment.

Shortly after the outbreak of the Franco-Prussian War in 1870, the North German Confederation also entered into conventions on military matters with states that were not members of the confederation, namely Bavaria, Württemberg, and Baden. Through these conventions and the 1871 Constitution of the German Empire, an Army of the Realm was created. The contingents of the Bavarian, Saxon and Württemberg kingdoms remained semi-autonomous, while the Prussian Army assumed almost total control over the armies of the other states of the Empire. The Constitution of the German Empire, dated April 16, 1871, changed references in the North German Constitution from Federal Army to either Army of the Realm or German Army.

After 1871, the peacetime armies of the four kingdoms remained relatively distinct. The term "German Army" was used in various legal documents, such as the Military Penal Code, but otherwise, the Prussian, Bavarian, Saxon and Württemberg armies maintained distinct identities. Each kingdom had its own War Ministry, Bavaria and Saxony published their own rank and seniority lists for their officers and the Württemberg list was a separate chapter of the Prussian army rank lists. Württemberg and Saxon units were numbered according to the Prussian system but Bavarian units maintained their own numbers (the 2nd Württemberg Infantry Regiment was Infantry Regiment No. 120 under the Prussian system).

Command

The commander of the Imperial German Army, less the Bavarian contingent, was the Kaiser. He was assisted by a Military Cabinet and exercised control through the Prussian Ministry of War and the Great General Staff. The Chief of the General Staff became the Kaiser's main military advisor and the most powerful military figure in the Empire. Bavaria kept its own Ministry of War and General Staff, but coordinated planning with the Prussian Great General Staff. Saxony also maintained its own Ministry of War and the Ministry of War of Württemberg also continued to exist.

The command of the Prussian Army had been reformed in the wake of the defeats suffered by Prussia in the Napoleonic Wars. Rather than rely primarily on the martial skills of the individual members of the German nobility, who dominated the military profession, the Prussian Army instituted changes to ensure excellence in leadership, organization and planning. The General Staff system, which sought to institutionalize military excellence, was the main result. It sought to identify military talent at the lower levels and develop it thoroughly through academic training and practical experience on division, corps and higher staffs, up to the Great General Staff, the senior planning body of the army. It provided planning and organizational work during peacetime and wartime. The Prussian General Staff, proven in battle in the Wars of Unification, became the German General Staff upon the formation of the German Empire, given Prussia's leading role in the German Army.

Military role in foreign policy decisions

In the German Empire, diplomatic relations were the responsibility of the Chancellor and his Foreign Minister. The German Army reported separately to the Emperor, and increasingly played a major role in shaping foreign policy when military alliances or warfare was at issue. In diplomatic terms, Germany used the Prussian system of military attaches attached to diplomatic locations, with highly talented young officers assigned to evaluate the strengths, weaknesses, and military capabilities of their assigned nations. They used close observation, conversations, and paid agents to produce very high-quality reports that gave a significant advantage to the military planners. The military staff grew increasingly powerful, reducing the role of the Minister of War, and increasingly asserted itself in foreign policy decisions. 

Otto von Bismarck, the Imperial Chancellor 1871–1890, was annoyed by military interference in foreign policy affairs – in 1887, for example, they tried to convince the Emperor to declare war on Russia; they also encouraged Austria to attack Russia. Bismarck never controlled the army, but he did complain vehemently, and the military leaders drew back. In 1905, when the Morocco affair was roiling international politics, the chief of the General staff Alfred von Schlieffen called for a preventive war against France. At a critical point in the July crisis of 1914, Helmuth von Moltke, the chief of staff, without telling the Emperor or chancellor, advised his counterpart in Austria to mobilize against Russia at once. During the First World War, Generalfeldmarschall Paul von Hindenburg increasingly set foreign policy, working directly with the Emperor—and indeed shaped his decision-making—leaving the chancellor and civilian officials in the dark. Historian Gordon A. Craig says that the crucial decisions in 1914, "were made by the soldiers and that, in making them, they displayed an almost complete disregard for political considerations."

Chiefs of the German General Staff (1871–1919)
 Helmuth von Moltke the Elder 7 October 1857 – 10 August 1888
 Alfred von Waldersee 10 August 1888 – 7 February 1891
 Alfred von Schlieffen 7 February 1891 – 1 January 1906
 Helmuth von Moltke the Younger 1 January 1906 – 14 September 1914
 Erich von Falkenhayn 14 September 1914 – 29 August 1916
 Paul von Hindenburg 29 August 1916 – 3 July 1919
 Wilhelm Groener 3 July 1919 – 7 July 1919
 Hans von Seeckt 7 July 1919 – 15 July 1919

Structure
The Kaiser had full control of the armed forces but used a highly complex organizational structure.

The basic peacetime organizational structure of the Imperial German Army were the Army inspectorate, the army corps, the division and the regiment. During wartime, the staff of the Army inspectorates formed field army commands, which controlled the corps and subordinate units. During World War I, a higher command level, the army group, was created. Each army group controlled several field armies.

Army inspectorate
Germany was divided into army inspectorates, each of which oversaw three or four corps. There were five in 1871, with three more added between 1907 and 1913.

 I Army Inspectorate: Headquartered in Danzig, became the 8th Army on mobilisation (2 August 1914)
 II Army Inspectorate: Headquartered in Berlin, became the 3rd Army on mobilisation (2 August 1914)
 III Army Inspectorate: Headquartered in Hannover, became the 2nd Army on mobilisation (2 August 1914)
 IV Army Inspectorate: Headquartered in Munich, became the 6th Army on mobilisation (2 August 1914)
 V Army Inspectorate: Headquartered in Karlsruhe, became the 7th Army on mobilisation (2 August 1914)
 VI Army Inspectorate: Headquartered in Stuttgart, became the 4th Army on mobilisation (2 August 1914)
 VII Army Inspectorate: Headquartered in Berlin, became the 5th Army on mobilisation (2 August 1914)
 VIII Army Inspectorate: Headquartered in Saarbrücken, became the 1st Army on mobilisation (2 August 1914)

Corps

The basic organizational formation was the army corps. The corps consisted of two or more divisions and various support troops, covering a geographical area. By 1914, there were 21 corps areas under Prussian jurisdiction and three Bavarian army corps. Besides the regional corps, there was also a Guard Corps, which controlled the elite Prussian Guard units. A corps usually included a light infantry battalion, a heavy artillery battalion, an engineer battalion, a telegraph battalion and a trains battalion. Some corps areas also disposed of fortress troops; each of the 25 corps had a Field Aviation Unit attached to it normally equipped with six unarmed "A" or "B" class unarmed two-seat observation aircraft apiece.

In wartime, the army corps became a mobile tactical formation and four  (Higher Cavalry Commands) were formed from the Cavalry Inspectorate, the equivalent of corps, being made up of two divisions of cavalry.

The military districts were to supervise the training and enlistment of reservists and new recruits. Originally each military district was linked to an army corps; thus Wehrkreis I took over the area that I. Armeekorps had been responsible for and sent replacements to the same formation. The first sixteen reserve corps raised followed the same pattern; X. Reserve-Korps was made up of reservists from the same area as X. Armeekorps. However, these links between rear areas and front line units were broken as the war went on and later corps were raised with troops from all over Germany.

Division

The basic tactical formation was the division. A standard Imperial German division was organized into:

 Division HQ
 two infantry brigades organized into a brigade HQ and two regiments each (either of the line or light infantry),
 a cavalry brigade organized into a brigade HQ and two regiments 
 an artillery brigade organized into an HQ and two regiments
 Combat service and support regiments under division HQ

One of the divisions in a corps area usually also managed the corps  region. In 1914, besides the Guard Corps (two Guard divisions and a Guard cavalry division), there were 42 regular divisions in the Prussian Army (including four Saxon divisions and two Württemberg divisions), and six divisions in the Bavarian Army.

These divisions were all mobilized in August 1914. They were reorganized, receiving engineer companies and other support units from their corps, and giving up most of their cavalry to form cavalry divisions. Reserve divisions were also formed,  brigades were aggregated into divisions, and other divisions were formed from replacement units. As World War I progressed, additional divisions were formed, and by wars' end, 251 divisions had been formed or reformed in the German Army's structure.

Regiment
The regiment was the basic combat unit as well as the recruiting base for soldiers. When inducted, a soldier entered a regiment, usually through its replacement or training battalion, and received his basic training. There were three basic types of regiment: infantry, cavalry and artillery. Other specialties, such as pioneers (combat engineers) and signal troops, were organized into smaller support units. Regiments also carried the traditions of the army, in many cases stretching back into the 17th and 18th centuries.

Each Imperial German regiment of infantry had headquarters units, three battalions and one training battalion assigned to the regimental depot. Cavalry, field and horse artillery regiments were also similarly organized.

National contingents
The German Empire was formed by 38 duchies and kingdoms each with their traditions of warfare. Although the new army of the united German Empire was nominally "German" and most state forces served integrated into the Prussian Army, the Bavarian Army, Saxon Army and Württemberg Army remained independent national contingents:

Nevertheless, in times of war, all of these would pledge allegiance to the Kaiser and the German nation. They did, however, remain organizationally distinct, being able to raise units of their own without assistance from the dominating Prussians. In one instance, Freiherr von Sonden (from Württemberg) was able to "quite legitimately send a request directly to the Ministry of War in Stuttgart for the raising of a new artillery regiment".

Regiments and units from separate constituents were also raised locally and often numbered independently from each other – for example, there was (among others) both a Bavarian 1st Infantry Regiment and a Württemberger 1st Infantry Regiment.

While the aforementioned contingents wore dinstinctive uniforms, with the differences becoming less over time, the origin of units would be denoted on the uniform in the colours of the rank insignia until the early 20th century. They also had different cockades on the headgear. The Imperial cockade was to be worn above the state cockade on hats and caps, while they were worn on the right (state on the left) of helmets and more specialised headgear.

Reserve system

When the British decided to reform their army in the 1860s, they surveyed the major European forces and decided that the Prussian system was the best one. That system was continued into the Imperial Army after 1871 and resulted in a modest cadre of professional officers and sergeants, and a large reserve force that could be quickly mobilised at the start of a war. The British could not use the system because they rejected conscription. The Japanese, however, were also observing the reserve system and, unlike the British, decided to copy the Prussian model.  explains that every young man was drafted at age 18, with the upper-class becoming officers:

Industrial base
The German Empire accounted for 12% of global industrial output in 1914, making it the largest industrial base in Continental Europe, and behind only Great Britain (18%) and the United States (22%) worldwide. The Army closely cooperated with industry, especially in the Great War, with particular focus on the very rapidly changing aircraft industry. The Army set prices and labor exemptions, regulated the supply of credit and raw materials, limited patent rights so as to allow cross-licensing among firms, and supervised management–labor relationships. The result was very rapid expansion and a high output of high-quality aircraft, as well as high wages that attracted the best machinists. Apart from aircraft, the Army's regulation of the rest of the war economy was largely inefficient.

Air Force
Although its name actually means something very close to "The German Air Force", it remained an integral part of the German Army for the duration of the war. The Kaiserliche Marine naval forces of the German Empire had their own, separate Marine-Fliegerabteilung maritime aviation forces, apart from the Luftstreitkräfte of the Army.

Ranks of the Imperial German Army

The German Army from 1871 to 1914 inherited the various traditions and military ranks of its constituent states, thus becoming a truly federal armed service.

Enlisted ranks
 Musketeer (Prussian army infantry regiments), Infantryman (Bavarian army infantry regiments), Soldier (Saxon army infantry regiments), Gunner (foot artillery), Pioneer (pioneer branch). Other unit-specific enlisted ranks were: Fusilier, Grenadier, Huntsman otherwise Light-Infantryman, Dragoon, Hussar, Cuirassier, Uhlan, Fusilier Guard, Grenadier Guard, Wehrmann (Landwehr), etc.
 Senior Lance Corporal; established in the Prussian Army from 1846 to 1853, reestablished in 1859, then in foot artillery only, replacing the artillery Bombardier rank that had been introduced in 1730.

Additionally, the following voluntary enlistees were distinguished:
 One-Year Volunteer Enlistee: despite the name, one-year volunteers were actually conscripts who served a short-term form of active military service, open for enlistees up to the age of 25. Such enlisted soldiers were usually high school graduates, who would opt to serve a one-year term rather than the regular two or three-year conscription term, with free selection of their chosen military service branch and unit, but throughout were obligated to equip and subsist themselves at entirely their own cost. In today's monetary value, this could at bare minimum cost some 10,000 euro, which purposely reserved this path open to officer-material sons from mostly affluent social class families wishing to pursue the Reserve-Officer path; it was the specific intention of Wilhelm II that such Reserve-Officer career path should only be open to members of so-called "officer-material" social classes. On absolving their primary recruit training and shorter military service term, those aspiring to become Reserve-Officers would have to qualify and achieve suitability for promotion to the  rank and then would continue to receive further specialized instruction until the end of their one-year term, usually attaining and leaving as surplus Corporals (Reservists), with the opportunity to advance further as reservists. Eligibility for this specific one-year path of military service was a privilege approved upon examining the enlistee's suitability and academic qualifications.
 Long-Term Volunteer Enlistee "Capitulant": enlisted soldiers who had already absolved their regular two or three-year military conscription term and had now volunteered to continue serving for further terms, minimum was 4 years, generally up to 12 years.

This distinction was never removed throughout their military service nor during any rank grade advancements.

Non-commissioned officers /

Junior NCOs (NCOs without Sword Knot) / 
 Corporal/Sub-Officer
 Sergeant

Senior NCOs (NCOs with Sword Knot) / 
 Sergeant Major 2nd class (Infantry: , Cavalry and Artillery: Vizewachtmeister/Vice-Wachtmeister) – rank held by reserve officer candidates after they passed lieutenant's examination
 Sergeant-Major (Infantry: Feldwebel (i.e. : CSM officially listed on the regiment's payroll, i.e. ), Cavalry and Artillery: )

Warrant Officers and Officer Cadets
 Cadet (ranking between Sergeant and Vizefeldwebel) – served as cadets in the various military academies and schools.
 Deputy Officer (ranking above )
 Acting Lieutenant (ranking as youngest 2nd Lieutenant, but without officer's commission and still member of the NCO's Mess until 1917)

Officer corps
Critics long believed that the Army's officer corps was heavily dominated by Junker aristocrats, so that commoners were shunted into low-prestige branches, such as the heavy artillery or supply. However, by the 1890s, the top ranks were opened to highly talented commoners.

Subalterns /

Staff Officers /

General Officers /

Dissolution
The Imperial Army was abolished on 6 March 1919, and the provisional  was created.

See also

 German General Staff
 
 German Army
 Prussian Army
 Bavarian Army
 Schutztruppe
 
 
 German Army order of battle (1914)
 German Army order of battle, Western Front (1918)
 All Quiet on the Western Front (novel set in World War I about German Army comrades)

Notes

References

Further reading
 Brose, Eric Dorn. The Kaiser's army: the politics of military technology in Germany during the machine age, 1870–1918 (Oxford University Press, 2004) online
 Citino, Robert M. The German way of war: from the Thirty Years' War to the Third Reich (University Press of Kansas, 2005)
 Clemente, Steven E. For King and Kaiser! The Making of the Prussian Army Officer, 1860–1914 (1992) online
 Coetzee, Marilyn Shevin. The German Army League: Popular Nationalism in Wilhelmine Germany (Oxford University Press, 1990)
 Craig, Gordon A. The Politics of the Prussian Army, 1640–1945 (Oxford University Press, 1964)
 Demeter, K. The German Officer Corps in Society and State 1650–1945 (Weidenfeld and Nicolson, 1965)
 Feldman, Gerald. Army, Industry and Labour in Germany, 1914–1918 (Bloomsbury Publishing, 2014)
 Foley, Robert T. "Institutionalized innovation: The German army and the changing nature of war 1871–1914." RUSI Journal 147.2 (2002): 84–90. online
 Herrera, Geoffrey L. "Inventing the Railroad and Rifle Revolution: Information, Military Innovation and the Rise of Germany." Journal of Strategic Studies (2004) 27#2 pp: 243–271. online
 Hull, Isabel V. Absolute destruction: Military culture and the practices of war in imperial Germany (Cornell University Press, 2004)
 Jackman, Steven D. "Shoulder to Shoulder: Close Control and" Old Prussian Drill" in German Offensive Infantry Tactics, 1871–1914." Journal of Military History 68.1 (2004): 73–104. online
 Kitchen, Martin. A Military History of Germany: From the Eighteenth Century to the Present Day (Indiana University Press, 1975)
 Kitchen, Martin. The German Officer Corps (Oxford UP, 1968)
 Mitchell, Allan. The great train race: railways and the Franco-German rivalry, 1815–1914 (Berghahn Books, 2000)
 Murphy, Patrick. "The Effect of Industrialization and Technology on Warfare: 1854–1878." (2006) online
 Muth, Jörg. Command Culture: Officer Education in the US Army and the German Armed Forces, 1901–1940, and the Consequences for World War II (University of North Texas Press, 2011)
 Showalter, Dennis. "From Deterrence to Doomsday Machine: The German Way of War, 1890–1914." Journal of Military History (2000) 64#3 pp: 679–710. in JSTOR
 Showalter, Dennis E. Railroads and rifles: soldiers, technology, and the unification of Germany (Archon Books, 1975)
 Showalter, Dennis E. "Army and Society in Imperial Germany: The Pains of Modernization." Journal of Contemporary History (1983): 583–618. in JSTOR
 Stevenson, David. "Fortifications and the European Military Balance before 1914." Journal of Strategic Studies (2012) 35#6 pp: 829–859.
 Stone, James. The war scare of 1875: Bismarck and Europe in the mid-1870s (Steiner, 2010)
 Stone, James. "Spies and diplomats in Bismarck’s Germany: collaboration between military intelligence and the Foreign Office, 1871–1881." Journal of Intelligence History (2014) 13#1 pp: 22–40.

External links

 WWI German Army Artillery & Infantry Attack Reenactment – video on YouTube

 
Disbanded armies
Disbanded armed forces
Articles containing video clips
Military of the German Empire
Military of the German Empire by branch
1871 establishments in Germany
1918 disestablishments in Germany
Military units and formations established in 1871
Military units and formations disestablished in 1918